Carousel is a 1937 German musical film directed by Alwin Elling and starring Marika Rökk, Georg Alexander, and Paul Henckels. It was shot at the Babelsberg Studios of UFA in Potsdam. The film's sets were designed by the art directors Artur Günther and Karl Vollbrecht.

Cast

References

Bibliography

External links 
 

1937 films
Films of Nazi Germany
German musical films
1937 musical films
1930s German-language films
Films directed by Alwin Elling
UFA GmbH films
German black-and-white films
1930s German films
Films shot at Babelsberg Studios